Stuart Clark is an English-Irish music journalist who has written extensively for the NME and Hot Press, and who regularly contributes to Irish TV and radio. Clark is also the deputy editor of Hot Press.

References

Living people
Hot Press people
Irish writers
Year of birth missing (living people)
Place of birth missing (living people)